Attila Kovács (born 17 February 1981 in Budapest) is a Hungarian football player who currently plays for Ceglédi VSE.

References
Paksi FC Official Website
Profile at HLSZ 

1981 births
Living people
Footballers from Budapest
Hungarian footballers
Association football goalkeepers
Csepel SC footballers
FC Tatabánya players
Balassagyarmati SE footballers
Paksi FC players
Veszprém LC footballers
Ceglédi VSE footballers
Nemzeti Bajnokság I players
21st-century Hungarian people